Harasiuki  (Harasiuky) is a village in Nisko County, Subcarpathian Voivodeship, in south-eastern Poland. It is the seat of the gmina (administrative district) called Gmina Harasiuki.

The village has a population of 862.

References

Villages in Nisko County